RMI may refer to:

Science and technology
 Radio-magnetic indicator, an instrument used in aircraft navigation
 Repetitive motion injury, an injury to the musculoskeletal and nervous systems
 Richtmyer–Meshkov instability, an instability occurring when two fluids with different densities are impulsively accelerated
 Risk of malignancy index, for ovarian cancer

Computing
 Remote Method Invocation, an application-programming interface used in Java environments
 .rmi, a file extension for a RIFF MIDI file

Organizations
 RMI Corporation, a semiconductor company manufacturing CPUs
 RMI Titanium Company, U.S. titanium fabricator now called RTI International Metals 
 Railcar Management LLC, a rail information services software company and subsidiary of GE Transportation
 RMI Expeditions, a mountain guide company based in Ashford, Washington, United States
 Remote Medical International, provides medical support in remote areas
 Rocky Mountain Institute, a non-profit energy-conservation organization in the United States of America
 Rocky Mount Instruments, manufacturer of the RMI 368 Electra-Piano and Harpsichord
 Royal Manchester Institution (1823–1882), a learned society promoting the arts in Manchester, England
Royal Meteorological Institute of Belgium, a federal institute engaged in scientific research in meteorology
 WRMI (branded Radio Miami International) an American shortwave radio station, often referred to on air as RMI
 Reaction Motors Inc., an early American maker of liquid-fueled rocket engines

Places
 Federico Fellini International Airport (IATA code), near Rimini, Italy 
 Republic of the Marshall Islands, a nation-state in Micronesia

Other uses
 Radio Massacre International, a British electronic-music group
 Ramapough Mountain Indians, a Native American group
 Rank mobility index, a measure of change in population-rank
 Revenu minimum d'insertion, a form of welfare introduced in France in 1988

See also
 RM1 (disambiguation)